Hans Gabriel Booys (born 4 December 1951 in Rehoboth, Hardap Region; died 19 July 2021) was a Namibian politician. A member of SWAPO, Booys was selected to the National Assembly to replace Nathaniel Maxuilili after he died in a vehicle accident. Shortly after, he was elected in his own right in the 1999 election. He was once again re-elected in the 2004 election.

In 2005 President Hifikepunye Pohamba appointed him to serve on the Security Commission – the constitutional body, which makes recommendations to the President on top army and police appointments and other security matters. He was SWAPO's Deputy Chief Whip in the National Assembly.

Career 
Booys joined SWAPO in 1974. From 1982 to 1990, he was a literacy instructor for the Namibia Literacy Project. In 1990, he became a regional commissioner at Khorixas, Kunene Region. From 1991 to 2002, Booys was a member of the SWAPO Central Committee.

Personal life 
He lived in Okahandja.

References

1951 births
2021 deaths
People from Hardap Region
People from Otjozondjupa Region
People from Kunene Region
People from Rehoboth, Namibia
Members of the National Assembly (Namibia)
SWAPO politicians